A by-election for the Australian House of Representatives division of Wills was held on 11 April 1992. It was triggered by the resignation of sitting Labor Party member and former Prime Minister Bob Hawke.

The by-election was won by independent candidate Phil Cleary. There were 22 candidates, the largest number ever to contest any House of Representatives seat. Though 22 candidates contested the 2009 Bradfield by-election, nine of the candidates were from the Christian Democratic Party.

Cleary's election was declared void by the High Court on the grounds that, as a teacher employed by the Victorian state government, he held an office of profit under the Crown at the time he nominated. No second by-election was held due to the imminence of the 1993 federal election.

Results

See also
 List of Australian federal by-elections
 Section 44 of the Constitution of Australia ... Sykes v Cleary

References

Wills by-election
Victorian federal by-elections
Wills by-election, 1992
Wills by-election